Čereňany is a village and municipality in Prievidza District in the Trenčín Region of western Slovakia.

History
In historical records the village was first mentioned in 1329.

Geography
The municipality lies at an altitude of 225 metres and covers an area of 18.978 km². It has a population of about 1,730 people.

Genealogical resources

The records for genealogical research are available at the state archive "Statny Archiv in Nitra, Slovakia"

 Roman Catholic church records (births/marriages/deaths): 1688-1895 (parish B)
 Lutheran church records (births/marriages/deaths): 1735-1950 (parish B)

See also
 List of municipalities and towns in Slovakia

References

External links

 
Surnames of living people in Cerenany

Villages and municipalities in Prievidza District